Pawan Kumar Sehrawat is an Indian kabaddi player who currently plays for Tamil Thalaivas in the VIVO Pro Kabaddi league and plays for Indian Railways in the Kabaddi nationals. Pawan became the most expensive player in the history of the league after Tamil Thalaivas picked him for record 2.26 crores. He is the best raider of season 6, 7 and 8.

Pro Kabaddi League career

Season 3 
He was introduced by coach Randhir Singh Sehrawat. Pawan Kumar Sehrawat had a productive rookie campaign for the Bengaluru Bulls and featured in 13 off their 14 games in Season 3. He finished the season as his team's leading raid-point scorer with 45.

Season 4 
The raider featured 10 times in Season 4 but scored only 11 points, raiding just 33 times over the course of the campaign. With Bengaluru Bulls adding Season 3 MVP Rohit Kumar and Deepak Kumar Dahiya, and it proved to be a disappointing season for Sehrawat as he slumped down the pecking order and saw limited opportunities to raid.

Season 5 
Sehrawat was picked up by new franchise Gujarat Fortunegiants for Season 5 and was mainly used as an impact raider off the bench. He played nine matches, including the final, and scored 10 points.

Season 6 
The raider returned to Bengaluru Bulls for Season 6 and had a stellar second debut, scoring 20 raid points against Tamil Thalaivas, which were as many as he managed in the previous two campaigns. He scored four Super 10s in his first five appearances and was engaged in a three-way battle with Patna Pirates’ Pardeep Narwal and U Mumba's Siddharth Desai in the race for the Best Raider award. He eventually finished with 13 Super 10s, two fewer than Narwal.
 
During the Playoffs, Sehrawat was in inspired form, scoring 13 raid points in Qualifier 1 and 22 in the final, both against Gujarat Fortunegiants and led Bengaluru Bulls to their maiden VIVO Pro Kabaddi title. He was crowned the league's MVP for Season 6.

Season 7 
After Rohit Kumar's dip in form, Pawan Sehrawat carried the Bulls on his shoulders, on their way to their second playoff appearance in a row. He finished the season as the league's top scorer with an astonishing 353 points. However, the Bulls fell short to the table toppers Dabang Delhi in the semi-final. He scored 39 raid points against Haryana Steelers, which is most by any raider in a single game in the history of Pro Kabaddi League beating Pardeep Narwal's record of 34 raid points which he scored against Haryana Steelers in  PKL 5.

Awards and achievements
 Most Valuable Player (2018)
 Most raid points (2018), (2019) and (2021).
 Most raid points in a Pro Kabaddi match, and most points by any player in a single half of Pro Kabbadi match. (39 and 18 points respectively, in a match vs Haryana Steelers in 2019.) 
 Most points by any player in a PKL final. (22 Points vs Gujarat Giants)

International career 
Pawan plays for the India national kabaddi team. He was a part of the national team at the 2019 South Asian Games, where he played an important role in helping the team win the gold medal.

References

External links 
 Pro Kabaddi | Records for Pro Kabaddi League Teams and Players
 https://www.prokabaddi.com/news/kumar-and-sehrawat-deliver-for-bengaluru-bulls-as-they-book-their-place-in-the-final
 Pawan Kumar Sehrawat emerges as Season 6’s Most Valuable Player
 Bengaluru Bulls vs Gujarat Giants live Pro Kabaddi score - Pro Kabaddi League
 https://www.kabaddiadda.com/player/pawan-kumar-sehrawat-1000070

1996 births
Living people
Indian kabaddi players
Pro Kabaddi League players
South Asian Games gold medalists for India
South Asian Games medalists in kabaddi